The L.W. Ross House, near Taylorsville, Kentucky, is a historic house with Queen Anne-style influences which was built in about 1896.  It was listed on the National Register of Historic Places in 1992.

It has a hipped roof with gabled-roof extensions, and an octagonal tower.

References

National Register of Historic Places in Spencer County, Kentucky
Queen Anne architecture in Kentucky
Houses completed in 1896
Houses on the National Register of Historic Places in Kentucky
1896 establishments in Kentucky